WRLW-CD, virtual channel 17 (UHF digital channel 21), is a low-powered Heartland-affiliated television station licensed to Salem, Indiana, United States. The station is owned by Rebecca White.

Programming 
The station provides local and regional news as well as Southern Indiana focused high school and college sports.

WRLW-CD carries a game of the week broadcast of Mid-Southern Conference and Patoka Athletic Conference basketball and football as well as partnering with the Indiana High School Athletic Association for post season contests.

The station also has exclusive rights from Learfield Sports to broadcast the audio from Indiana University sports and Purdue University Sports (via audio feed from WSLM and WSLM-FM) to the Louisville market via the WRLW TV channels.

Other local programming will include Coffee Club, Coach's Corner, Breaking News and news from schools in Washington County.

Digital channels
The station's digital signal is multiplexed:

References

External links

RLW-CD
Television channels and stations established in 1989
Heartland (TV network) affiliates